Varadaiahpalem is a village in Tirupati district of the Indian state of Andhra Pradesh. It is the mandal headquarters of Varadaiahpalem mandal. Varadaiahpalem is known to many because of Oneness University.

This Mandal is growing on rapid basis due to industrial development of Sri City and APACHE at TADA and Sullurpet.

Geography 
Famous Ubbalamudugu Falls is present in this mandal.

References 

Mandal headquarters in Tirupati district
Villages in Tirupati district
Tirupati district